Paivaea is a genus of darkling beetles in the family Tenebrionidae. There is one described species in Paiavaea, P. hispida.

References

Tenebrionidae
Articles created by Qbugbot